The Faculty of Chemistry and Earth Sciences is one of twelve faculties at the University of Heidelberg. It comprises the Institute of Inorganic Chemistry, Institute of Organic Chemistry, Institute of Physical Chemistry, Institute of Geography, Institute of Geology and Paleontology, Institute of Mineralogy, and the Institute of Environmental Geochemistry.
Chemistry was established as a separate discipline at the University of Heidelberg in 1817 with Leopold Gmelin being appointed ordinary professor of chemistry and medicine. 1895 is considered to be the date of foundation of Geography at the University of Heidelberg as it was from this year on that lectures in physical and mathematical geography were held on a regular basis. In 1899 the first professorship in geography was established, filled by Alfred Hettner.

Institute of Inorganic Chemistry

Institute of Organic Chemistry

Institute of Physical Chemistry

The main research areas of the Institute of Physical Chemistry are: 
 laser-induced chemical processes and laser diagnostics of technical combustion and catalytical processes
 single molecule spectroscopy of biological samples
 dynamic regulation of adhesive contacts and of the cytoskeleton architecture of biological cells using novel micro- and nanostructured materials
 design and advanced characterization of functional surfaces and interfaces
 biocompatible coatings for biotechnology and medical applications
 nanolithography and -technology
 chemical and biochemical sensors
 x-ray microscopy and holography
 theoretical studies of the electronic structure and dynamics of molecules
 theoretical investigations to reveal new phenomena in prototype neutral and charged molecular species

Institute of Geography
The first professorship in geography was established in 1899, filled by Alfred Hettner. The earth scientist Bernhard Eitel is currently the rector of the University of Heidelberg.

Institute of Geology and Paleontology
Paleontology was established in 1823 with lectures by Heinrich Georg Bronn.

Institute of Mineralogy
The first chair for mineralogy was established in 1817 with Karl Cäsar von Leonhard.

Institute of Environmental Geochemistry
Prof. German Müller established the Institute of Environmental Geochemistry in 1993. The main research areas of the institute are:
the rates and mechanisms of chemical weathering of rock-forming minerals, including surface studies of reactions at the mineral-water interface
chemical and isotopic evolution of atmospheric aerosols derived from rock-weathering, and their variation with Holocene climate change
geochemical studies of lake sediments and peat bog archives of these records, including chemical weathering and early diagenesis
physical and chemical processes at mineral-water interfaces such as adsorption, desorption, and redox transformations
the chemical and isotopic evolution of natural waters, including diffusion chamber studies of early diagenetic reactions in sediments
transformation of element species in soils and sediments and natural waters intensity and rates of humification of natural organic matter
natural halogenation and de-halogenation of organic molecules development of hyphenated instrumental techniques (HPLC-AAS, HPLC-ICP-AES, GC-MS) and pyrolytic methods for species analysis

Noted chemists and earth scientists
Leopold Gmelin
Friedrich August Kekulé von Stradonitz
Robert Bunsen
Victor Meyer
Theodor Curtius
Gustav Kirchhoff
Hermann von Helmholtz
Emil Erlenmeyer
Dmitri Mendeleev
Carl Bosch
Alfred Hettner
Harry Rosenbusch
Victor Mordechai Goldschmidt
Paul Ramdohr
Julia Lermotova

Notes and references

Heidelberg University